Józef Lange (16 March 1897 – 11 August 1972) was a Polish cyclist. He competed in two events at the 1924 Summer Olympics winning a silver medal in the men's team pursuit. He also competed in two events at the 1928 Summer Olympics.

References

External links
 

1897 births
1972 deaths
Polish male cyclists
Olympic cyclists of Poland
Cyclists at the 1924 Summer Olympics
Cyclists at the 1928 Summer Olympics
Olympic silver medalists for Poland
Olympic medalists in cycling
Medalists at the 1924 Summer Olympics
Cyclists from Warsaw
People from Warsaw Governorate
Burials at Powązki Cemetery